Madi Okollo is a District in the west nile region of Uganda. It is located in the northern part of Uganda Originally under Arua District comprising Rigbo, Ogoko Ewang, Inde town council, Rhino Camp Town council (all in lower madi) and Okollo, Uleppi, Offaka, Anyiribu, Okollo sub-counties and Okollo Town Council.

Economic Activities 
The main economic activities in Madi Okollo county are fishing in the Nile and peasant farming of sesame and cotton.

Animal husbandry is also practised, with goats and cattle being the main animals kept. Goats do so well that Madi Okollos are sometimes termed Madi Goats in the region. However, because of drought and degradation of soil, the number of goats in the county (especially Okollo sub-county) has dropped.

To save the scary situation, irrigation from the Ora River and the Nile is believed to be the only alternative.

Arua District
Counties of Uganda